Eduardo Armstrong Toro (24 January 1851 – 19 June 1895) was Mayor of Ponce, Puerto Rico, from 1894 to 3 May 1895. He was the brother of Thomas Armstrong Toro, for whom a high school is named in Ponce, Puerto Rico.

Early years
Armstrong Toro was born in Ponce, Puerto Rico, on 24 January 1851. His parents were Peter Luther Lothario Armstrong Creagh (1800–1863) and Antonia Toro Y Loudón (1825–1901), who married on 14 May 1840. He was the sixth of eight children born to Peter Luther and Antonia. His seven siblings were Tomás (1841–1907), Emilia (1843–1914), Jaime (1845 – ca. 1850), Carlos Walter (1847–1913), Ana (1849–1930), Guillermo (1853 – ca. 1855), and Carolina (1855–1890).

Mayoral term
Armstrong Toro was mayor of Ponce from 10 August 1894 to 3 May 1895. He was a member of the Partido Liberal Reformista, and ran an efficient government, neither encountering nor generating any significant malfunctions. He was focused on maintaining the city clean and well cared for.  Armstrong Toro is best remembered for ordering the elimination of houses in ruins throughout the city and the construction of new buildings in their place. He also advanced the cause of public education in the city.

Death
Armstrong Toro died while in office on 19 June 1895 after a short illness. He was 44 years old. Félix Saurí, at the time Teniente de Alcalde gave notice of Armstrong's death and took over mayoral duties on an interim basis.

See also

 List of Puerto Ricans
 List of mayors of Ponce, Puerto Rico

References

Further reading
 Fay Fowlie de Flores. Ponce, Perla del Sur: Una Bibliografía Anotada. Second Edition. 1997. Ponce, Puerto Rico: Universidad de Puerto Rico en Ponce. p. 335. Item 1670. 
 Ponce. Presupuesto municipal para el ejercicio de 1894 a 95. Ponce, Puerto Rico: Tipografía de "El Independiente", 1894?  (Biblioteca del Congreso [Washington, D.C.]; Colegio Universitario Tecnológico de Ponce, CUTPO [fotocopia])

Mayors of Ponce, Puerto Rico
1851 births
1895 deaths